The 1920 Hammond Pros season was the franchise's inaugural season in the American Professional Football Association (APFA) and second as an American football team. The Pros entered 1920 coming off a 4-win, 2-loss, 3-tie (4–2–3) record in 1919 as an independent team. Several representatives from another professional football league, the Ohio League, wanted to form a new national league, and thus the APFA was created.

The Pros opened the 1920 season with a 26–0 loss to the Rock Island Independents. The team did not score a point until their third game, and ended the season with a 2–5 record, which placed it tied for 11th place in the final standings. The sportswriter Bruce Copeland compiled the 1920 All-Pro list, but no players from the Pros were on it. As of 2012, no player from the 1920 Hammond Pros roster has been enshrined in the Pro Football Hall of Fame.

Offseason 

The Hammond Pros, who were named the Hammond All-Stars, finished 4–2–3 in their 1919 season as an independent team. The All-Stars disbanded, and three teams were created from those players: the Chicago Tigers, the Decatur Staleys, and the Pros. After the 1919 season, representatives of four Ohio League, a professional football league based in Ohio, teams—the Canton Bulldogs, the Cleveland Tigers, the Dayton Triangles, and the Akron Pros—called a meeting on August 20, 1920, to discuss the formation of a new professional league. At the meeting, they tentatively agreed on a salary cap and pledged not to sign college players or players already under contract with other teams. They also agreed on a name for the circuit: the American Professional Football Conference. They then invited other professional teams to a second meeting on September 17.

At that meeting, held at Bulldogs owner Ralph Hay's Hupmobile showroom in Canton, representatives of the Rock Island Independents, the Muncie Flyers, the Decatur Staleys, the Racine Cardinals, the Massillon Tigers, and the Hammond Pros agreed to join the league. Representatives of the Buffalo All-Americans and Rochester Jeffersons could not attend the meeting but sent letters to Hay asking to be included in the league. Team representatives changed the league's name slightly to the American Professional Football Association and elected officers, installing Jim Thorpe as president. Under the new league structure, teams created their schedules dynamically as the season progressed, so there were no minimum or maximum number of games needed to be played. Also, representatives of each team voted to determine the winner of the APFA trophy.

Roster 
Mose Bashaw
Tony Catalano
Edward Davis
Guil Falcon
Hank Gillo
Wilbur Henderson
Wally Hess
Max Hicks
Carol Johnson
Klinks Meyers

Schedule 
If a team has a dagger, then that team in a non-APFA team. For the results column, the winning team's score is posted first followed by the result for the Pros. For the attendance, if a cell is greyed out and has "N/A", then that means there is an unknown figure for that game. The green-colored cells indicates a win; and the red-colored cells indicate a loss. The Pros, who did not have a scheduled home game, were a traveling team.

Game summaries

Week 3: at Rock Island Independents 

October 10, 1920, at Douglas Park

The Pros started their season in week three with a game against the Rock Island Independents. The Independents already played two games and were undefeated. There were no scores by either team in the first or third quarters, but the Independents scored 13 points in the second and fourth. Running backs Fred Chicken, Ray Kuehl, and Gerald Mansfield accounting for four touchdowns throughout the game. Quarterback Pudge Wyman throw two touchdowns—a 35-yard one to Kuehl and a 20-yard one to Mansfield. Hammond started to purposely injure their opponents during the game because they realized the Independents were a much greater team. As a result, Rube Ursella suffered a twisted knee. Duey Lyle was kicked in the face and required seven stitches. Lastly, Ed Healey was kicked in the face needed five stitches in the cheek.

Week 4: at Dayton Triangles 

October 17, 1920, at Triangle Park

The Dayton Triangles were the Pros' next opponent. For a second week in a row, the Pros did not score a point. In the first quarter, Triangle back Al Mahrt had a one-yard rushing touchdown. The Triangles scored three touchdowns in the second quarter: a 50-yard receiving touchdown from Mahrt, a 35-yard receiving touchdown from end Dave Reese, and a rushing touchdown from back Lou Partlow. The extra point was missed after the first touchdown. In the next quarter, back George Roudebush kicked a 35-yard field goal. The last score of the game was a receiving touchdown from back Norb Sacksteder. The final score of the game was 44–0 before a crowd of 2,000.

Week 6: at Logan Squares 

October 31, 1920, at Logan Square Park

After two losses, the Pros decided to not schedule a game in week five and challenge a non-APFA team in week six. Their next opponent, the Logan Squares from Chicago, were on a two-game winning streak. The scoring summary is unavailable, but the Pros defeated the Squares 14–9 in front of 3,000 attendees.

Week 7: at Pullman Thorns 

November 7, 1920, in Chicago, Illinois

In week seven, the Pros challenged the Pullman Thorns, a non-APFA team. The Thorns were undefeated going into this game with a record of 3–0. The scoring summary is unknown. For the Pros, Hank Gillo and Mace Roberts both scored rushing touchdowns; for the Thorns, LaForest had two rushing touchdowns. The Pros converted two extra points, while the Thorns only converted one. The final score of the game was a 14–13 victory for the Pros.

Week 8: at Gary Elks 

November 14, 1920, at Gleason Field

After a two-game winning streak, the Pros played the Gary Elks, a non-APFA team, at Gleason Field, with 2,000 people in attendance. The Elks game into the game with an undefeated 5–0–1 record. The Pros were the first team to score when Gilo had a 20-yard rushing touchdown in the first quarter; the extra point was missed, however. The score would stay 6–0 until Smeltzer of the Elks caught a pass from Leverette in the fourth quarter. The extra point was made, and the final score of the game was a 7–6 loss for the Pros.

Week 9: at Decatur Staleys 

November 21, 1920, at Staley Field

In week 9, the Pros battled the Decatur Staleys in front of 3,000 fans. In the first quarter, Staley back Ralph Lanum scored a 23-yard rushing touchdown. This touchdown was Lanum's only score of the entire 1920 season. Ed Sternaman of the Staleys scored a 10-yard rushing touchdown in the second quarter. Also, George Halas caught a 15-yard receiving touchdown from Jimmy Conzelman to have the game 21–0 going into halftime. In the third quarter, the Staleys did not score, but the Pros put points on the board. Wally Hess caught a 15-yard pass from Emmett Specht for a touchdown. In the final quarter, Halas scored a 26-yard receiving touchdown, and the game ended 28–7.

Week 10: at Chicago Boosters 

November 25, 1920, at DePaul Field

In their final game of the 1920 season, the Pros played the Chicago Boosters, a non-APFA team. The Boosters came into the game with an undefeated record of 3–0–4. The scoring summary is unknown, but four players of the Boosters—Annan, Bond, Reilly, Applehans—scored a touchdown. The final score of the game was a 27–0 loss for the Pros.

Standings

Post season 
With a losing record, the Pros could not contend for the APFA Championship. After the season was over, the team hired Max Hicks to be the coach for the following season. The Pros' 1920 record of 2–5–2 would be their best outing until 1924; the team folded two years later. Sportswriter Bruce Copeland compiled the 1920 All Pro team, but no player made the list. As of 2012, no players from the 1920 Hammond Pros were enshrined in the Pro Football Hall of Fame.

References

Bibliography
 
 
 
 
 
 

Hammond Pros seasons
Hammond Pros
1920 in sports in Indiana
1920 American Professional Football Association season